In Darkness is the second studio album by Varials. It was released on October 11, 2019, through Fearless Records. It is their last release to feature Travis Tabron as vocalist, since he announced his departure from the band later in 2020.

Release
Varials released four singles, "I Suffocate", "Bleeding", "Romance", and "The Love Machine" for the album on September 23, and released the album through Fearless on October 11, 2019. Varials supported Counterparts on their Private Room 2.0 Tour throughout the Fall of 2019. Varials will be heading to Europe to support Polaris on their Death of Me Tour.

Musical style
Lyrically, the album touches on the subject of depression, anxiety, and loneliness. Sonically, the album takes influence from artists such as Nine Inch Nails, Slipknot, and Deftones, while also including a heavy twist that Tess Hofer of Dead Press! called "the musical equivalent of standing in a battlefield but without the guns and violence".

Track listing

Personnel 
Varials

 Travis Tabron – vocals
 Mitchell Rogers – lead guitar, vocals
 James Hohenwarter – rhythm guitar
 Mike Foley – bass
 Sean Rauchut – drums

Additional musicians

 Brendan Murphy – vocals (6)

Additional personnel

 Cody Demavivas – A&R 
 Errick Easterday – artwork, design
 Brad Wiseman – booking (agent)
 Mike Tompa – engineer (vocal features), producer (vocal features) (6)
 Jeff McKinnon – engineer (vocals, additional) (1, 2, 6 & 15)
 Carl Severson – management 
 Josh Schroeder – production, recording, mixing, mastering
 Marc Mutnansky – project manager

References

External links 

 In Darkness on Bandcamp

2019 albums
Fearless Records albums
Varials albums